Forgotten Foundation is the second album by Bill Callahan (also known as Smog), released in 1992 on Drag City. It is the last album that Callahan recorded at home.

Track listing

Side one
"Burning Kingdom"
"Filament"
"High School Freak"
"Your Dress"
"Barometric Pressure"
"Guitar Innovator"
"Evil Tyrant"
"Head of Stone I"
"Head of Stone II"
"Long Gray Hair"
"Kiss Your Lips"

Side two
"Bad Ideas for Country Songs I"
"Bad Ideas for Country Songs II"
"Dead River"
"Bad Investment"
"Brown Bag"
"Let Me Have That Jar Back"
"This Insane Cop"
"97th Street"
"Do the Bed"
"I'm Smiling"
"With a Green Complexion"

References 

1992 albums
Bill Callahan (musician) albums
Drag City (record label) albums